The giant babax (Pterorhinus waddelli) is a species of bird in the laughingthrush family Leiothrichidae, found in India and Tibet.  It prefers the low bushes at the edge of the southern Tibetan plateau, and is threatened by habitat loss. A common sight around villages and monasteries, where it feeds off scraps, it is a bulky, long-tailed brown bird with a curved bill and dark streaks. Its vocalizations vary between melodic flute-like notes and harsh jabbering ones.

The giant babax was described by the English ornithologist Henry Dresser in 1905 from a specimen collected by the British explorer Laurence Waddell in the Yarlung Tsangpo river valley in Tibet. Based on the results of a comprehensive molecular phylogenetic study of the Leiothrichidae that was published in 2018, the giant babax was placed in the resurrected genus Pterorhinus.

References

Collar, N. J. & Robson C. 2007. Family Timaliidae (Babblers)  pp. 70 – 291 in; del Hoyo, J., Elliott, A. & Christie, D.A. eds. Handbook of the Birds of the World, Vol. 12. Picathartes to Tits and Chickadees. Lynx Edicions, Barcelona.

External links
Xeno-canto: audio recordings of the giant babax

giant babax
Birds of Northeast India
Birds of Tibet
giant babax
Taxonomy articles created by Polbot
Taxobox binomials not recognized by IUCN